Khan Bahadur Nawab Sir Liaqat Hayat Khan   (also sometimes 'Liaquat Hyat Khan'), (February 1887 – 1948) was an Indian official who served for most of his career as a minister and later Prime Minister of Patiala State, in British India.

Early life

Sir Liaqat was the son of Nawab Muhammad Hyat Khan, CSI, Khattar, of Wah (now in Pakistan Punjab), and the elder brother of Sir Sikandar Hyat Khan. His grandson, Nawab Sadiq Hussain Qureshi served as both Governor and Chief Minister of Punjab during the regime of Bhutto. He was educated in Col. Brown Cambridge School, Dehra Dun. He died in 1948.

Career
He began his career as Deputy Superintendent of Police, Punjab in 1909. In 1919, he became Superintendent in charge of a district. In 1923, his services were lent by Patiala as Home Secretary where he later became Home Minister. He later became Prime Minister of Patiala from 1930 to 1940. He represented Patiala at the Round Table Conferences in 1931 and 1932. He represented Patiala at Joint Committee on Indian Constitutional Reform in 1933. He served as political advisor to Nawab of Bhopal from 1943 to 1945.

See also
 Nawab Muhammad Hayat Khan

References

1887 births
1948 deaths
All articles lacking reliable references
Hayat Khattar family
Punjabi people